The NFL on Nickelodeon is the branding used for broadcasts of National Football League (NFL) games that are produced by CBS Sports, and broadcast on the American pay television channel Nickelodeon. In 2021, Nickelodeon hosted a one-time simulcast in coordination with CBS of the Chicago Bears–New Orleans Saints Wild Card game. This marked the first time that a major live sporting event would be broadcast on the channel. Following positive reception from media and fans, Nickelodeon announced that the simulcast would return for a Wild Card game during the 2021–22 NFL playoffs between the San Francisco 49ers and Dallas Cowboys. In May 2022, Nickelodeon announced that the simulcast would return for a Christmas game during the 2022 NFL season between the Denver Broncos and Los Angeles Rams.

Background 

In December 2019, Viacom re-merged with CBS Corporation to form ViacomCBS. As part of the merger, CBS announced plans to add content from Nickelodeon to its CBS All Access streaming service. Additionally, the National Football League announced that Nickelodeon would air a youth-specific broadcast of an early 2021 Wild Card playoff game that CBS Sports acquired the rights to, marking the first major live sporting event on the channel. The broadcast had the inclusion of Nickelodeon cartoon branding as well as commentary from Nick stars Gabrielle Green and Lex Lumpkin.

CBS Sports' ad sales team handled the ad sales for both telecasts. While a majority of the advertisements for the Bears-Saints game would be the same across both the CBS and Nickelodeon broadcasts, Nickelodeon aired some different ads more that were tailored to its younger audience, excluding ads for alcohol and sports betting apps.

First live telecast (January 10, 2021) 

Nickelodeon's first live NFL game aired on January 10, 2021, as a special youth-specific presentation of the 2021 Wild Card playoff game between the New Orleans Saints and Chicago Bears.

Tie-ins 
During the week leading up to the game, Madden NFL 21's "The Yard" mode was updated with SpongeBob SquarePants themed content, including a Bikini Bottom-themed "reef-top" stadium, and SpongeBob-themed modifiers. Immediately prior to the game, Nickelodeon aired a sports-themed SpongeBob clip show, The SpongeBob SportsPants Countdown Special, which was hosted by Burleson.

Nickelodeon in correlation with the National Football League, also launched a website with sports betting-like elements such as free-to-play games and risk-free gambling. More specifically, users of the site would get the chance to pick who would win the game, which would in return, compare to the public pick. The user could receive points that could be exchanged for prizes and rewards. The NFL Nick Play website also featured the ability to collect SpongeBob SquarePants and The Loud House-themed content via QR codes.

Denver Broncos linebacker Von Miller was originally supposed to host The SpongeBob SportsPants Countdown Special instead of Nate Burleson, but was not present. It was later revealed on January 15, that Miller was under an unknown criminal investigation in Colorado. A preview of the then-new SpongeBob SquarePants spin-off series, Kamp Koral: SpongeBob's Under Years, was also aired at halftime.

Broadcast incidents 
Referee Alex Kemp's open microphone caught Chicago Bears wide receiver Cordarrelle Patterson saying "What the fuck?" in reaction to a penalty for unsportsmanlike conduct after he voluntarily ran out of bounds during a punt. Patterson later claimed he did not utter the expletive. At the time, Kemp mistakenly called the penalty on #85, tight end Cole Kmet, instead of Patterson who was #84.

Despite his team's loss and completing only 19 passes for 199 yards, Bears quarterback Mitchell Trubisky won the online voting for the NVP, or Nickelodeon Valuable Player, award with 49% of the votes after podcast host Dan Katz had led an online campaign with the Twitter hashtag #Mitch4NVP, encouraging viewers to submit multiple votes for Trubisky. He received a trophy, adorned with the Nickelodeon blimp. Chicago defensive end Akiem Hicks and New Orleans defensive end Cameron Jordan finished second and third in voting, respectively.

After volunteering to do so, Saints head coach Sean Payton was slimed after his team's 21–9 victory. A communication disconnect prevented Cameron Jordan from joining Payton in the sliming like sideline reporter Lex Lumpkin tried to do.

Second live telecast (January 16, 2022)

Background 
On March 18, 2021, Richard Deitsch of The Athletic asked Sean McManus about the future of Nickelodeon-style NFL games. McManus said that there's a section in the new CBS deal regarding alternate telecasts such as the Nick game, but not weekly. On September 1, 2021, it was announced that the Wild Card simulcast would return for the 2021 NFL season. On December 16, 2021, Nickelodeon announced that Noah Eagle, Nate Burleson, and Gabrielle Nevaeh Green would once again call the channel's NFL Wild Card playoff game telecast, which featured the eighth postseason meeting between the San Francisco 49ers and Dallas Cowboys. It was also announced that Dylan Gilmer would replace Lex Lumpkin as the sideline reporter.

Tie-ins 
During the week leading up to the game, Rugrats and Teenage Mutant Ninja Turtles themed content was added alongside the SpongeBob content in Madden NFL 22's "The Yard" mode. Two days prior to the game, Nickelodeon aired a sports-themed The Loud House clip show, The Loud House Super Sports Special. A new episode of The Loud House served as the game's lead-in, while a sneak peek of the then-new Nickelodeon series, Warped!, served as the lead-out. A preview of the then-new Paramount+ series, Big Nate, was also aired at halftime.

Broadcast incidents 
San Francisco tight end George Kittle was heard over an open microphone saying "fuck" late in the second quarter, repeating Cordarrelle Patterson's incident in the previous year's broadcast.

Dallas quarterback Dak Prescott won the online fan voting for NVP, marking the second straight year that the losing team's quarterback received the game's most valuable player award after Chicago's Mitch Trubisky won the inaugural award in 2021.

Coincidentally, referee Alex Kemp, who officiated the Bears-Saints Wild Card Game a year ago, was also the referee for this game.

Third live telecast (December 25, 2022)

Background 
On May 10, 2022, as part of the NFL's schedule release, CBS announced that a special Christmas Day game between the Denver Broncos and Los Angeles Rams would take place at 4:30 PM ET on CBS and Nickelodeon. This was the first regular season game to air on Nickelodeon. On December 6, 2022, Nickelodeon announced that Burleson, Eagle, and Green would return to call the telecast. It was also announced that Gilmer would return as sideline reporter and Patrick Star (voiced by Bill Fagerbakke) would offer live commentary during the game.

Tie-ins 
During the week leading up to the game, alongside the SpongeBob content in Madden NFL 23's "The Yard" mode, players can take on ten challenges based on moments featuring Nickelodeon NVP winners in the 2021 Wild Card game and the 2021 season and earn two exclusive Nickelodeon NVP cards (both the 2021 Wild Card game and the 2022 Christmas game (token usable on January 3, 2023)) and SpongeBob gear in the "Ultimate Team" mode. A new episode of The Loud House served as the game's lead-in, while a new episode of That Girl Lay Lay served as the lead-out. A preview of the new PAW Patrol spin-off series, Rubble & Crew, also aired at halftime.

List of televised games

On-air staff 

The January 10, 2021 broadcast, between the Chicago Bears and New Orleans Saints, featured All That cast members Gabrielle Nevaeh Green and Lex Lumpkin joining Noah Eagle (son of CBS announcer Ian Eagle and a Los Angeles Clippers broadcaster) and Nate Burleson from The NFL Today on the announcing team.

Eagle said "The idea was to captivate and cultivate a new fan base, younger people who might not otherwise watch the game. We wanted to explain enough so that those people, those kids watching their first football game, could have at least a general understanding of what was happening." Eagle added that he planned on "getting the basics in there" but always keeping in mind that he's speaking to "an 11-year-old who maybe hasn't tried football before." When recalling the moment that Nickelodeon asked him to take part in the broadcast, Eagle said that it was something that really catered to his interests.

Eagle added that when he calls Los Angeles Clippers basketball games, he like to blend and blur the lines between sports, entertainment, pop culture, TV, movies, music, etc. That is something according to Eagle, that Nickelodeon is literally built for. Accordingly, Cara Cooper of the Martinsville Bulletin wrote that most young adults' first experiences with sports came through Nickelodeon with game shows such as Double Dare, GUTS, and Legends of the Hidden Temple. Incidentally, on the first flag of the Saints-Bears game, Nate Burleson noted that it wasn't "like a flag in Double Dare" that was pulled and passed along when the competitor got to the end of the slime-filled tract.

Meanwhile, Burleson said in reaction to Nickelodeon asking him to serve as an analyst "I knew old shows on Nickelodeon, but I didn't want to be Mr. Retro. I asked them, 'What are the newest ones? What are they coming out with in 2021? What are the characters that really stand out to you guys?'" And when explaining the rules of the game on a base level to novice football viewers, Burleson said "Gaining the 10 yards is like little homework assignments, and then you get into the red zone, and that's like the test." Burleson also described being tackled as feeling like "falling down wooden stairs."

While Noah Eagle was tasked with describing the play-by-play action, and Nate Burleson was there to break down the more complicated aspects of football into understandable terms, 15 year old Gabrielle Nevaeh Green was there to offer insights and asks questions as a stand-in for young viewers unfamiliar with the sport. During the January 10 telecast, the crew tried to explain to viewers the play clock's importance, why third down plays are crucial, and the meaning of what a catch actually is.

According to Green, who became the first female to commentate in a CBS booth during the NFL playoffs, she was going to up there with Eagle and Burleson to provide some fun for the kids at home. She added that she was very new to football and felt like a lot of kids and families at home who were going to be watching the broadcast would be new as well, and that's what was so special about this. Green said that Nickelodeon would be bringing football to a brand-new audience and that it would be a lot of fun. Green also believed that it would inspire girls like her and this would let them know they could do anything they put their minds to. Green in the process, was accidentally given CBS analyst Tony Romo's 800-page game notes package.

Green's All That co-star Lex Lumpkin, who would serve as a sideline reporter for the game, said that Nickelodeon was going to be up close and personal with the players. Lumpkin also stressed that bringing both the NFL and Nickelodeon together for the first time, as well as a new look and new feel would be amazing. Lumpkin claimed that while he didn't specifically reach out to other sideline reporters, he did do research in watching them and seeing how they did it. Lumpkin more specifically, watched how they reacted to certain things and what they might have said when they were up.

For the January 16, 2022 broadcast, the booth stayed largely the same, however, Dylan Gilmer (of the Nickelodeon series Tyler Perry's Young Dylan) would replace Lumpkin as the sideline reporter.

For the December 25, 2022 broadcast between the Los Angeles Rams and Denver Broncos from SoFi Stadium in Inglewood, California, Dylan Schefter (the daughter of ESPN reporter, Adam Schefter and contributor to Nickelodeon's NFL Slimetime) served as the sideline reporter. Following the game, Schefter interviewed the game's Nickelodeon Valuable Player Award winner, Rams quarterback Baker Mayfield. The Christmas Day 2022 telecast also featured live commentary by actor Bill Fagerbakke in character as Patrick Star from SpongeBob SquarePants.

Digital on-screen graphics 

Although Disney XD had aired the Pro Bowl in the past few years, the game broadcast was just a simulcast feed from ABC and ESPN. The Wild Card Game on Nickelodeon in contrast, would feature an exclusive broadcast targeting a kids audience. On that end, the graphics would feature the CBS Sports template with a modified design that would tie more into the Nickelodeon brand. Therefore, Nickelodeon labeled their approach to broadcasting the NFL as being "Nick-ified" in order to create a buzz with its fresh approach. Nickelodeon used pulsing green-and-orange

Nickelodeon worked with the agency Elevation to develop the branding and on-air look for the January 10, 2021 broadcast. Elevation noted that Nickelodeon's classic orange and slime-green colors were the starting point for the look. They intended on bringing in football-themed visuals along with characters from key Nickelodeon shows. Elevation then developed animation tests for the in-game graphics and the promo toolkit. Nickelodeon's in-house team further developed the in-game graphics along with CBS Sports and the sports technology and data company, SMT. Ultimately, over 125 clips were used throughout with 22 minutes of animation appearing with the game. The first-down lines were created by the aforementioned SMT. A trial run was conducted during the Philadelphia Eagles-Green Bay Packers game on December 6, 2020, to test the graphics, animation and filters.

Iain Armitage, in character as Sheldon Cooper from CBS' TV comedy series Young Sheldon appeared over the scoring bug to explain to viewers the rules such as a false start. A giant version of SpongeBob SquarePants appeared between the crossbars during field goal attempts. SpongeBob SquarePants also appeared in player stat graphics to include their "Favorite snack" and "Favorite classic Nick show". Meanwhile, analyst Nate Burleson called the red zone "the money zone", as he drew a dollar bill sign on the cartoon-like graphic.

Nickelodeon's broadcast as a whole, aimed to focus less on stats and more on fun facts about the players—such as a player's favorite flavor of ice cream or even a "tale of the tape" between New Orleans Saints running back Alvin Kamara and Alvin the Chipmunk. Not only that, but Nickelodeon also put important team relationships in terms they feel their audience can understand such as Drew Brees and Taysom Hill of the New Orleans Saints and SpongeBob SquarePants and Patrick Star. Nickelodeon even put up a graphic depicting Patrick Star "trolling" Bears wide receiver Javon Wims after he dropped the ball that would've resulted in a wide-open touchdown. Speaking of Drew Brees, Nate Burleson on the January 10 broadcast compared him to being like the kid at recess who never misses at dodgeball.

For highlight reels, Nickelodeon implemented digital, comic strip-like animation such as white smoke, green slime, blue lightening, players were given superimposed googly eyes and hamburger hats, as well as a dancing Lincoln Loud from The Loud House.

And whenever a player scored a touchdown, two augumented reality green slime-cannons set off on both sides of the endzone or the "slime zone" as Nickelodeon dubbed it. Nickelodeon's broadcast also featured pixelated halftime highlights that were presented in an all block graphic style similar to the video game Minecraft.

According to Shawn Robbins, coordinating producer at CBS Sports, Cameras 1 and 3 are usually pushed in after a touchdown during a standard NFL on CBS broadcast. But for Nickelodeon's production, they would lose the augmented reality effect of the slime cannons if the shot isn't wide. In total, Nickelodeon had eight of its own cameras and five EVS replay servers as well as access to the 18 camera signals for the standard CBS broadcast. Nickelodeon also had three replay editors working remotely using Hawkeye. Two would work on the CBS broadcast and the third on the Nickelodeon broadcast. Jason Cohen, VP, remote technical operations at CBS Sports added that there are hard and field-level cameras that would frame shots in certain ways. The Nickelodeon editors would from there, be allowed to take that footage and uniquely repurpose it.

Second live telecast (January 16, 2022) 
For Nickelodeon's second live NFL telecast on January 16, 2022, the network introduced a real-time, augmented reality graphic of a giant slime monster, which would periodically pop up behind the defense.

This particular graphic was created with the help from The Famous Group, who also helped provide the graphic depicting SpongeBob SquarePants' face in the crossbar, and a graphic showing the orange Nickelodeon blimp sliming the field right before the kickoff. While there was a blimp graphic that briefly appeared during the 2021 playoff broadcast, this particular rendition not only cast lifelike shadows on the field, but also adjust to the time of day, and allow cameras to zoom in and out while it's in the camera's frame. The graphics were based on Epic Games' Unreal Engine. This was in contrast to the usage of Adobe After Effects during the previous year's NFL playoff game on Nickelodeon.

Another subtle change is the SpongeBob SquarePants graphic between the crossbar now being able to more instantly react to the kick's result in real-time. And instead of the  Minecraft-like "Blockie" characters used to simulate actual formations and routes, three-dimensional models based on the Teenage Mutant Ninja Turtles was used during highlights. Nickelodeon enlisted the services of Beyond Sports to create the animation for said highlights. The "Slime Zone" graphics were also modified to allow for one of Nickelodeon's six dedicated cameras to zoom on one of the slime cannons following a touchdown.
 
This time around, Sonic the Hedgehog and Tails from Sonic the Hedgehog 2 were also showcased on the broadcast alongside SpongeBob and the titular Teenage Mutant Ninja Turtles from the 2012 TV series. When explaining to Nickelodeon's young viewers the significance of the rivalry between the Dallas Cowboys and San Francisco 49ers, the broadcast used the rivalry between Mr. Krabs and Plankton from SpongeBob SquarePants as an analogy.

The January 16, 2022 broadcast also featured a brief parody of ESPN's alternate Monday Night Football broadcasts featuring Peyton and Eli Manning. Nickelodeon's version of the "Manningcast" featured Pro Football Hall of Famer Deion Sanders talking to SpongeBob SquarePants and Patrick Star.

Third live telecast (December 25, 2022) 
For Nickelodeon's third live NFL telecast on December 25, 2022, the network partnered with Silver Spoon for on-screen Christmas graphics, which included slime, snow, and presents being shot out of cannons, a Yeti, and Santa Claus running routes. The on-screen graphics have been updated to match those from the main broadcast on its sister channel, CBS. The "TOUCHDOWN" graphic was entirely modified to include an illustration of the player's headshot, in the style of The Loud House, as well as the player's name and jersey number. The customary Nickelodeon graphics also returned, including cartoon characters being beamed on the field, and the Nick blimp flying over SoFi Stadium. Former New England Patriots and Tampa Bay Buccaneers tight end Rob Gronkowski (dressing as an elf, who is also known as Robbie the Elf) appeared in an on-screen graphic to explain to viewers the rules, such as what a holding penalty is.

Ratings 
The January 10, 2021 broadcast on Nickelodeon drew approximately 2 million viewers. This was a 245% increase from the previous year's time slot. According to Nickelodeon, it was the most-watched program among total viewers in nearly four years. Combined with the roughly 30 million viewers who watched the Saints-Bears game on CBS, then approximately 30.653 million viewers watched in total. This was the biggest audience that CBS received for a Sunday wild card playoff game since 2014. That figure was still 13% down from the same window from the previous year though, when the Seattle Seahawks and Philadelphia Eagles playoff game pulled in 35.12 million viewers on NBC.

According to a poll conducted by Morning Consult, more than 70% of parents said they would watch a game like that with kids after showing them a one-minute clip of highlights to give them a sense of Nickelodeon's broadcast. Two-thirds said that Alphas would enjoy the Nickelodeon broadcast more than the traditional version on CBS.

Shortly there afterward, CBS Sports chairman Sean McManus said CBS Sports was open for more sports experiments with ViacomCBS properties. McManus added that he put specific emphasis on how are they going to broadcast the game itself and still make it attractive to audiences of all ages. The Nickelodeon-NFL broadcast of the NFL Wild Card playoff game itself, took nine months to put together. McManus previously said that a major factor in CBS wanting to get one of the two extra playoff games in 2020-21 was in order for them to place a dual, kids-focused broadcast on Nickelodeon. McManus also said that the NFL understood that the broadcast on Nickelodeon than was going to look different from a normal CBS NFL broadcast. He added that the NFL really saw the value and are intent on reaching a younger audience since that's where the fans of the future are.

The January 16, 2022 broadcast on Nickelodeon drew approximately 1.3 million viewers. Combined with the 40 million viewers who watched the 49ers-Cowboys game on CBS, then approximately 41.496 million viewers watched in total. This was the biggest audience that any television network received for a Sunday wild card playoff game since 2015. That figure was 35% up from the same window from the previous year. According to CBS Sports, it was the most-streamed non-Super Bowl NFL game ever on Paramount+.

The December 25, 2022 broadcast on Nickelodeon drew approximately 900,000 viewers. This was a 400% increase over the previous year's Christmas Day time slot, as well as the highest-rated Christmas Day telecast since 2016, with approximately 2.6 million viewers watching in full or in part. Combined with the roughly 22 million who watched the Broncos-Rams game on CBS, then approximately 22.574 million viewers watched in total. Despite that figure being down from both the Christmas and equivalent Sunday windows the previous year, it was the largest Christmas audience for CBS.

Reception 
Reaction on social media to Nickelodeon's telecast of the Chicago Bears-New Orleans Saints playoff game on January 11 was mostly positive, with the non-targeted adult audience applauding the fun the network was having.

Tim Keown of ESPN.com, even though he thought the game was "terrible", said in a review, "the Nick broadcast was a hell of a lot of fun, maybe the best experience I've had watching a game this season." The poor offensive play didn't hurt his enjoyment of the broadcast, calling it, "nice to hang out in a place where nobody seemed to care." Meanwhile, Conor Orr of Sports Illustrated praised the looser feel and nature compared to most NFL broadcasts, saying, "I left Sunday's game with no doubt that football would be completely fine if we yanked the business pants off the current operation like Nickelodeon did over the weekend and allowed the things we like about the sport to speak for themselves. If we embraced the goofiness of the entire thing."

Phil Rosenthal of the Chicago Tribune wrote that as an alternative to CBS' standard coverage with Jim Nantz and Tony Romo on the call, Nickelodeon did a nice job helping educate youngsters about pro football and brighten a not-so-exciting playoff game between the Saints and Bears. As for the commentating crew, Rosenthal said that Nickelodeon stars Lex Lumpkin and Gabrielle Nevaeh Green were good company and sweetly genuine despite their scripted material being hit or miss. Meanwhile, Rosenthal praised the work of play-by-play announcer Noah Eagle and analyst Nate Burleson, who according to Rosenthal, managed to keep things light all the while, explaining what was happening in the game and what it meant. Rosenthal also summarized that while the sheer novelty of Nickelodeon's animation and special effects faded, it never vanished and that it was overall, wonderfully goofy.

Former St. Louis Rams quarterback Kurt Warner wrote on Twitter that his 31-year-old son Zach, who suffered a traumatic brain injury at four months old and is legally blind, had never sat and watched a football game with him until Nickelodeon's broadcast of the Saints-Bears game on January 10. Additionally, Doug Farrar of Yahoo Sports said that Nickelodeon's broadcast was an absolutely delightful experience from start to finish.

Farrar in particular noted that one of the best things about the broadcast is that the younger broadcasters like Gabrielle Nevaeh Green asked intelligent questions, and the more experienced football people like Nate Burleson actually managed to give the answers back without a hint of condescension. Wes McElroy of the Richmond Times-Dispatch also praised Burleson and Noah Eagle for explaining the game to a younger audience without being condescending. This included how the first down markers work, why the challenge flag is red and penalty flag is yellow, and taking a moment when Chicago Bears tight end Cole Kmet threw the ball and using it as an example on how to use your words not your actions.

Emily Ohman of The Daily Californian said that the broadcast maintained a healthy balance of kid-friendly and playoff-football-surly while Nickelodeon's animations were creative, educational and endlessly entertaining, and the broad. According to Ohman, the biggest success from Nickelodeon's broadcast was that it addressed head-on the gatekeeping that bars people from enjoying football. Ohman noted that such gatekeepers have prevented a large portion of the population from enjoying football, whether from a lack of prior knowledge or the exclusive nature of the game. Instead, Ohman believed that Nickelodeon's broadcast was influential because it made a space for every type of audience member, whether it would be the novice, the casual follower, the superfan, the kid, the adult, the boy, or the girl. Ohman in particular, Nickelodeon, in their approach to creating an educational type of NFL broadcast, still kept the lighthearted and profoundly pleasing outlook that they are known for.

Criticism 
The announcement of Nickelodeon broadcasting its first-ever NFL game was not without skepticism and concern, especially in regards to how or if the network would confront the realities of playing such a brutal sport and the risks of sustaining brain trauma for its young audience. During the January 12 broadcast, Christopher Nowinski, co-founder and CEO of the Concussion Legacy Foundation, co-founder of the Boston University CTE Center said on Twitter "That'll get kids killed." in reaction to analyst Nate Burleson comparing New Orleans Saints quarterback Taysom Hill hitting his head to scraping your knee at recess.

Another concern was raised regarding whether or not Nickelodeon's website, NFL Nick Play, which created and targeted printable "pick'em sheets" for children to select winners of that week's NFL games, was appropriate. Critics have argued that something like this is ingraining betting habits at a young age. NFL Nick Play also includes little quizzes on the different positions in football, information on how those positions work, and how the game plays out.

Praveen Nair of the UCSD Guardian said that it was frustrating that the Nickelodeon broadcast cut to the commentators for the couple minutes after Bears wide receiver Anthony Miller was ejected for punching Saints safety C. J. Gardner-Johnson in the face without explaining what was happening on the field.

Shoulder programming

Nickelodeon Takes Over the Super Bowl (2004) 

Nickelodeon's first involvement with the National Football League was in 2004. In conjunction with CBS' then upcoming coverage of Super Bowl XXXVIII from Houston on February 1, 2004, CBS aired the hour long special Nickelodeon Takes Over the Super Bowl.

Nickelodeon Super Duper Super Bowl Pregame Spectacular (2021) 
Nickelodeon also participated in tie-ins for Super Bowl LV, also televised by CBS. Nickelodeon aired a half-hour special, The Nickelodeon Super Duper Super Bowl Pregame Spectacular, which was hosted by Gabrielle Nevaeh Green and Lex Lumpkin.

NFL Slimetime 

On September 10, 2021, ViacomCBS announced that it would air a weekly NFL series on Nickelodeon and Paramount+, NFL Slimetime, hosted by Nate Burleson and Dylan Gilmer. It began airing on September 15, and would air Wednesdays at 7 p.m. throughout the NFL season.

References

External links 

Production website

Nickelodeon NFL playoff broadcast: What to expect for the unique slime and cartoon-filled Wild-Card game
NFL on Nickelodeon: Saints top Bears in Super Wild-Card matchup geared at kid audience
The Nickelodeon Broadcast Was a Reminder That Football Doesn't Have to Be So Serious
The Bears-Saints Nickelodeon game was goofy -- and the most fun NFL broadcast of the year
CBS Sports, Nickelodeon team up to air 'NFL Wild Card Game on Nickelodeon' on Jan. 10 
Nickelodeon's first NFL playoff game is slime-filled fun
Nickelodeon, CBS Sports to "Nick-ify" NFL playoff game to reach younger audience
Why the Bears vs. Saints NFL playoff game is on Nickelodeon
How Nickelodeon, CBS Sports Plan to 'Nick-ify' an NFL Playoff Game
Nickelodeon's Wacky NFL Game Ends With Saints Coach Sean Payton Drenched In Slime

National Football League television series
2020s Nickelodeon original programming
2021 American television series debuts
English-language television shows
Simulcasts
CBS Sports